Ricky Walker (born April 18, 1996) is a gridiron football defensive tackle for the Winnipeg Blue Bombers of the Canadian Football League (CFL). He played college football at Virginia Tech.

Early years
Walker attended Bethel High School. As a junior, he was a two-way player, making 70 tackles and 11 sacks, while receiving first-team All-district and All-region honors. 

As a senior, he missed 2 games with an injury, finishing with 73 tackles (15 for loss) and 11 sacks, while receiving second-team All-state honors.

College career
Walker accepted a football scholarship from Virginia Tech. As a true freshman, he played in 11 games as a backup defensive tackle and tallied 9 tackles (one for loss). He was redshirted in 2015.

As a sophomore, he appeared in all 14 games (4 starts). He registered 28 tackles (6.5 for loss), 1.5 sacks, 4 quarterback hurries, 4 pass breakups and 2 kickoff returns for 19 yards on special teams.

As a junior, he was named the starter at the 3-technique tackle spot. He collected 41 tackles (12.5 for loss), 4.5 sacks, 6 quarterback hurries, one pass break up and one fumble recovery for a touchdown.

As a senior, he was limited with a foot injury during the first half of the season. He recorded 49 tackles, 10.5 tackles for loss (led the team), 2 sacks and 2 forced fumbles. He also was a finalist for the Dudley Award, given to the top collegiate player in the state of Virginia.

Professional career

Dallas Cowboys
Walker was signed as an undrafted free agent by the Dallas Cowboys, after being passed on the 2019 NFL Draft because of a lack of height. He had 3 tackles (one for loss) and one quarterback hit in the preseason game against the San Francisco 49ers. He was waived on August 31.

Tampa Bay Vipers
In October 2019, he was selected by the Tampa Bay Vipers during phase 3 of the 2020 XFL Draft. In March, amid the COVID-19 pandemic, the league announced that it would be cancelling the rest of the season. He finished the XFL's debut season with 8 tackles and one quarterback hit in 5 games. He had his contract terminated when the league suspended operations on April 10, 2020.

Cleveland Browns
On August 22, 2020, Walker signed with the Cleveland Browns. The Browns waived Walker on September 3, 2020.

Winnipeg Blue Bombers
Walker signed with the Winnipeg Blue Bombers of the CFL on February 19, 2021. He played in his first career regular season game on August 13, 2021.

References

External links
Winnipeg Blue Bombers bio
Virginia Tech bio

1996 births
Living people
Sportspeople from Newport News, Virginia
Players of American football from Virginia
American football defensive tackles
Virginia Tech Hokies football players
Dallas Cowboys players
Tampa Bay Vipers players
Cleveland Browns players
Winnipeg Blue Bombers players